Udhailiyah (Arabic: العضيلية ʿuḍayliyyah) is a small oil company compound in the interior of the Eastern Province of Saudi Arabia located in the desert southwest of the Dhahran-Dammam-Khobar metropolitan area.  Built by the national oil company Saudi Aramco, Udhailiyah has a population of approximately 1,350 residents.  Udhailiyah can also be seen with the spellings Udeliya, Udayliyah, and other variations with the same phonetics.

Udhailiyah compound (Aramco code: UDH) is the smallest of four residential compounds built by Saudi Aramco, including Dhahran (the main administrative center), Ras Tanura (the main refinery and oil port), and Abqaiq.  It is the southernmost and most isolated of the four communities, Abqaiq being its closest Saudi Aramco compound to the north, about an hour away by car.  To the northeast is the city of Hofuf and the expansive al-Ahsa Oasis.  Udhailiyah takes its natural character from the numerous rocky hills or outcroppings, called "jebels", that surround it. The tallest and most popular Jebel is "Pioneer Mountain."  An equally popular and impressive jebel is named "747" due to its likeness of a Boeing 747 Jumbo Jet.

Similar to the other three compounds, Udhailiyah is surrounded by multiple perimeter fences,  Saudi Aramco employees and their dependents live inside. The community today is a multi-ethnic mosaic of Saudis, Americans, South Africans, other Arab nationalities (e.g. Egyptian and Jordanian), Indians, Pakistanis, etc.

Udhailiyah camp has amenities including swimming pools, weight rooms (separate for males and females), dining halls, golf course (oil-sand greens), tennis facilities, squash and racquetball courts, library and a commissary (small grocery store). There is also the Wahat Al-Ghawar, a large, air-conditioned tent used for company and social events. Udhailiyah is heavily planted with green spaces and open parks with large trees and extensive irrigation.

History
The camp was originally a bachelor camp set up for drilling crews. In the late 1970s it was expanded extensively to accommodate family status western employees. Beginning in 1977, the camp began taking in additional family status employees as the Gas Gathering Program began to take shape. Providing housing for Aramco's Gas Projects Division and their principal contractors, Fluor Arabia, Santa Fe, C.E. Lummus, and others, the camp expansion was designed by a California architecture firm that included green belts, adobe style town houses, and a new Kindergarten through ninth grade school. The camp was "mothballed" in the late eighties following the completion of Phase IIA of the Gas Program. The camp was reopened in the early nineties near the end of Operation Desert Storm. In the years following Desert Storm, management kept the camp open and quietly played down any connection between Western personnel and the US military presence in the kingdom. Udhailiyah had originally been built to accommodate far more people than were now housed there.

On 13 May 2015, a fire erupted at Udhailiyah's dining hall. It was speculated that a malfunction with the primary oven of the restaurant had caused the outbreak of flames. There were no reported casualties.

The Udhailiyah compound is reserved for family status Saudi Aramco employees and selected family status contractor employees

Transportation

Airport 
There is a small single strip airport near Udhailiyah (Udhayliyah Airport) operated by Saudi Aramco and not open for commercial air traffic. Saudi Aramco also utilizes the nearby Al-Ahsa International Airport in Hofuf which is 30 km away from Udhailiyah and operates international flights to regional destinations such as Dubai and Doha. Full international air transportation is available at the King Fahd International Airport which is about 190 km away.

See also
Saudi Aramco
Abqaiq
Dhahran
Mutawa
Ras Tanura

References

Populated places in Eastern Province, Saudi Arabia
Gated communities in Saudi Arabia
Saudi Aramco